Canton Junior Senior High School is a diminutive, rural public combined junior senior high school located at 509 E Main Street, Canton, Pennsylvania. In 2015, Canton Junior Senior High School enrollment was reported as 422 pupils in 7th through 12th grades.
Canton Area High School students may attend Northern Tier Career Center  for vocational training. In April 2012, Canton Area School District contracted with BLAST Intermediate Unit #17 to provide: special education services, federally funded IDEA services and technology services to the school.

Extracurriculars
The Canton Area School District offers a variety of clubs, activities and sports for high school and junior high school students.

Clubs include:
Band
Students Against Destructive Decisions (SADD)
FFA
Language clubs
Scholarship Challenge
Library Club
DJ Club

Sports
The district provides the following varsity sports:

Boys
Baseball- A
Basketball - AA
Cross Country - A
Football - A
Track and Field  - AA
Wrestling	 - AA

Girls
Basketball - A
Cheerleading - AAAA
Cross Country - A
Softball - A
Track and Field - AA
Volleyball - A

Junior high school sports

Boys
Basketball
Cross Country
Football
Track and Field
Wrestling	

Girls
Basketball
Cross Country
Track and Field
Volleyball

According to PIAA directory July 2015

References

Schools in Bradford County, Pennsylvania
Education in Lycoming County, Pennsylvania
Education in Tioga County, Pennsylvania
Public high schools in Pennsylvania